The second season of American crime-comedy-drama television series Castle was ordered on May 15, 2009, by ABC. The season aired from September 21, 2009, to May 17, 2010. The second season was originally renewed with an order of 13 episodes, but a few weeks after the season premiere, on October 20, 2009, ABC ordered a full season increasing the episode count to 24 episodes.

Overview
Richard Castle (Fillion) is a famous mystery novelist who has killed off the main character (Derek Storm) in his popular book series and has writer's block. He is brought in by the NYPD for questioning regarding two copy-cat murders based on two of his novels. He is intrigued by this new window into crime and murder, and uses his connection with the mayor to charm his way into shadowing Detective Kate Beckett (Katic). Castle decides to use Beckett as his muse for Nikki Heat, the main character of his next book series. Beckett, an avid reader of Castle's books, initially disapproves of having Castle shadow her work, but later warms up and recognizes Castle as a useful resource in her team's investigations.

Cast

Main cast
 Nathan Fillion as Richard Castle
 Stana Katic as Dt. Kate Beckett
 Jon Huertas as Dt. Javier Esposito
 Seamus Dever as Dt. Kevin Ryan
 Tamala Jones as Dr. Lanie Parish
 Ruben Santiago-Hudson as Captain Roy Montgomery
 Molly C. Quinn as Alexis Castle
 Susan Sullivan as Martha Rodgers

Recurring cast
 Arye Gross as Sidney Perlmutter 
 Juliana Dever as Jenny 
 Michael Trucco as Detective Tom Demming

Guest cast
 Dana Delany as Special Agent Jordan Shaw 
 Diana Maria Riva as Detective Roselyn Karpowski 
 Phil LaMarr as Dr. Holloway 
 Leonard Roberts as Special Agent Jason Avery 
 Danny Nucci as Gilbert Mazzara 
 John Brantley Cole Jr. as Officer Clayton Lee 
 Stephen J. Cannell as himself 
 Michael Connelly as himself
 Scott Paulin as Jim Beckett

Episodes

DVD release

Awards and nominations

References

2010 American television seasons
2011 American television seasons
Season 2